Banff was a territorial electoral district that was mandated to return a single member to the North-West Legislative Assembly from 1891 until Alberta became a province in 1905.

Geography
The electoral district was named for Banff, covering the Alberta portion of the Rocky Mountains and foothills west of Calgary.

Members of the Legislative Assembly (MLAs) 

Banff's first representative was physician Robert Brett, who had already served one term as MLA for Red Deer, and served two full terms in Banff. There were no official parties in these early assemblies, but Brett aligned himself with the Northwest Territories Liberal Party when the Dominion party lines were introduced in 1898.

In the 1898 election, Brett appeared to have held his seat against challenger Arthur Sifton, but Sifton challenged the results in court and proceeded to win the ensuing by-election. In 1902, he easily defended his seat.

When Sifton was appointed as a judge in early 1903, another by-election was held in Banff, this time won by Liberal candidate Charles Fisher. In 1905 when Alberta became a province, Fisher ran in the new Banff district and defeated previous MLA Robert Brett (now running as a Conservative) to retain the seat.

Election results

Elections in the 1890s

|}

|}

|}

|}

Elections in the 1900s

|}

|}

|}

References

External links 
Website of the Legislative Assembly of Northwest Territories

Former electoral districts of Northwest Territories